The Merrifield House, also known as Rosebank, is a historic house at 11 Woods Lane in Ipswich, Massachusetts.  It was built c. 1792 by Francis Merrifield, Jr., a veteran of the American Revolutionary War.  The main block of the house is a 2.5 story, nearly square, wood-frame structure with an off-center chimney.  The house has a number of rambling additions, some of which may have been built by Merrifield to accommodate his large family.  It is also somewhat unusual in having a second cooking fireplace in its second level.

The house was listed on the National Register of Historic Places in 1980.

See also
National Register of Historic Places listings in Ipswich, Massachusetts
National Register of Historic Places listings in Essex County, Massachusetts

References

Houses completed in 1792
Houses in Ipswich, Massachusetts
National Register of Historic Places in Ipswich, Massachusetts
Houses on the National Register of Historic Places in Essex County, Massachusetts
Federal architecture in Massachusetts